Parafomoria halimivora is a moth of the family Nepticulidae. It is found in the Iberian Peninsula.

The length of the forewings is 2.1-2.3 mm for males and 1.8-2.2 mm for females. Adults are on wing in April, May and September. There are probably several generations per year.

The larvae feed on Halimium alyssoides, Halimium atriplicifolium, Halimium halimifolium and Halimium ocymoides. They mine the leaves of their host plant. The mine consists of a narrow tortuous corridor, the first section is hardly visible. The frass is deposited in a thick central line, almost filling the width of the gallery. Pupation takes place outside of the mine.

External links
Fauna Europaea
bladmineerders.nl
A new species of Parafomoria Van Nieukerken, and some additional notes on the genus (Lepidoptera: Nepticulidae)

Nepticulidae
Moths of Europe
Moths described in 1985